Alexander Macdonald (1885–16 June 1960) was a Scottish minister who was Moderator of the General Assembly of the Church of Scotland in 1948.

Early life
Macdonald was born in North Uist in 1885. He studied at the University Glasgow and graduated with an arts degree. During World War I he was a chaplain with the Queen’s Own Cameron Highlanders for a two-year period.

Pastoral duties
He was appointed to St Columba’s Church in Glasgow in 1929. He was Moderator of Presbytery of Glasgow from 1942 for a year. He was elected as Moderator of the General Assembly of the Church of Scotland in 1948, for a one-year period of office. He retired from pastoral duties at St Columba's in 1954.

Later life
He died in Glasgow on 16 June 1960. His funeral was held on 19 June 1960.

Awards and honours
He received an honorary Doctor of Divinity from Glasgow University in 1944.

References

1885 births
1960 deaths
Moderators of the General Assembly of the Church of Scotland
20th-century Ministers of the Church of Scotland